Leonardo Pieraccioni (born 17 February 1965) is an Italian film director, actor, comedian and screenwriter.

Born in Florence, he made his directorial debut with The Graduates (1995). In 1996 he directed his breakthrough film The Cyclone, which grossed 75 billion lire at the box office.

In 1998, he starred with Harvey Keitel and David Bowie in the western comedy Gunslinger's Revenge, directed by Giovanni Veronesi.

Also a writer of short stories, his books include Trent'anni, alta, mora (1998), Tre mucche in cucina (2002) and A un passo dal cielo (2003).
Pieraccioni has starred with Suzie Kennedy, the impersonator of Marilyn Monroe, in Me and Marilyn.

Filmography

References

External links

 

1965 births
Living people
Film people from Florence
Italian film directors
Italian male film actors
Italian screenwriters
Italian male screenwriters
Nastro d'Argento winners
Ciak d'oro winners